Tiverton is a former civil parish, now in the parishes of Tiverton and Tilstone Fearnall and Tarporley, in Cheshire West and Chester, England. It contains 20 buildings that are recorded in the National Heritage List for England as designated listed buildings.  Of these, one is listed at Grade II*, the middle grade, and the others are at Grade II.  The parish is rural, apart from the villages of Tiverton and Hand Green.  The Shropshire Union Canal passes through the parish, and there are six listed structures associated with this.  Otherwise the listed buildings are houses or farm buildings, some of which date from the 17th century or earlier and are timber-framed, a former Baptist chapel, and a telephone kiosk.

Key

Buildings

References
Citations

Sources

Listed buildings in Cheshire West and Chester
Lists of listed buildings in Cheshire